Meidaizhao Monastery or Meidaizhao Lamasery is a Tibetan Buddhist temple located in Tumed Right Banner, Baotou, Inner Mongolia, China.

Name
"Zhao" means "monastery" in Mongolian language.

History
After the fall of the Yuan dynasty (1271–1368), the Mongolian went back to the north, historically known as "Northern Yuan dynasty" (1368–1635).

During the Longqing period (1567–1573) of the Ming dynasty (1368–1644), Altan Khan, the leader of a Mongolian tribe named Tumd, was canonized as "King of Shunyi" by the central government of Ming Empire, and then he started to build monastery towns on mountains belongs ti Tumd. In 1575, the first monastery was completed, which was called "Shouling Monastery" in the early Qing dynasty (1644–1911) and later was granted a name of "Fuhua Town" by the government.

In 1606, Erketü Qatun invited a Tibetan living Buddha named Maitreya Khutukhtu to came to the prairie for preaching and presided over the Buddhism activities in Shouling Monastery. To commemorate Maitreya Khutukhtu's achievements, local people changed its name to "Maitreya Monastery" or "Meidaizhao Monastery".

During the Cultural Revolution (1966–1976), a hall was demolished by the Red Guards and the monastery was used as a granary.

In 1996, it was listed among the fourth group of "Major National Historical and Cultural Sites in Inner Mongolia" by the State Council of China.

Architecture

Meidaizhao Monastery is a grand temple complex integrating monasteries, mansions and towns. It is a combination of Tibetan, Mongolian and Han Chinese architectural style. The extant buildings include the Taihe Tower, Mahavira Hall, Liuli Hall, Naiqiong Monastery, Taihou Monastery, Dailai Monastery, Caishen Monastery, etc.

Ancient Wall

Taihe Tower
The Taihe Tower is a triple eaves gable and hip roof building. It was first built in 1606 and rebuilt in 1985. In the center of the eaves of the hall is a plaque, on which there are the words "".

Mahavira Hall
The Mahavira Hall is situated in the north of the Taihe Tower with double eaves gable and hip roof. On the walls are paintings with stories of Sakyamuni's becoming Buddha, which are bright in color, fluent in lines and with the style of Tibetan frescos.

Taihou Monastery
The Taihou Monastery is situated in the northeast of the Mahavira Hall with double eaves gable and hip roof. The monastery enshrines a sandalwood pagoda that preserves the ashes of Erketü Qatun, the Empress Dowager of Tumd.

See also
 List of Major National Historical and Cultural Sites in Inner Mongolia

References

Bibliography

 

Tibetan Buddhist temples in Inner Mongolia
Buddhist temples in Baotou
Gelug monasteries
Buildings and structures in Baotou
Tourist attractions in Baotou
16th-century establishments in China
16th-century Buddhist temples